The Arabic letter mark (ALM) is a non-printing character used in the computerized typesetting of bi-directional text containing mixed left-to-right scripts (such as Latin and Cyrillic) and right-to-left scripts (such as Persian, Arabic, Syriac and Hebrew).

Similar to the right-to-left mark (RLM), it is used to change the way adjacent characters are grouped with respect to text direction, with some difference on how it affects the bidirectional level resolutions for nearby characters.

Unicode
Usage is prescribed in the Unicode Bidirectional Algorithm.

See also 
Right-to-left mark
Left-to-right mark
Bi-directional text

External links 
Proposal to encode the Arabic Letter Mark (ALM)
Unicode standard annex #9: The bidirectional algorithm
Unicode character (U+061C)

Control characters
Digital typography
Unicode formatting code points